Keokuk Municipal Airport  is five miles northwest of Keokuk, in Lee County, Iowa. The National Plan of Integrated Airport Systems for 2017–2021 categorized it as a general aviation facility.

Ozark Airlines DC-3s stopped at Keokuk from 1950 to 1954.

Facilities
The airport covers 372 acres (151 ha) at an elevation of 671 feet (205 m). It has two concrete runways: 8/26 is 5,500 by 100 feet (1,676 x 30 m) and 14/32 is 3,576 by 100 feet (1,090 x 30 m).

In the year ending July 21, 2015 the airport had 8,050 aircraft operations, average 22 per day: 94% general aviation and 6% air taxi.  In January 2017, 17 aircraft were based at the airport: 15 single-engine and 2 multi-engine.

References

External links 
 Aerial image as of April 1999 from USGS The National Map
 

Airports in Iowa
Transportation buildings and structures in Lee County, Iowa